Franziska Troegner (born 18 July 1954) is a German actress; she was born in Berlin-Mitte.

Starting in 1976, Troegner was part of the theatre company Berliner Ensemble where she played in Brecht plays, e.g. Mother Courage and Her Children, The Threepenny Opera, The Caucasian Chalk Circle. She dubbed minor roles in several Miss Marple TV series, e.g. A Murder Is Announced, A Pocket Full of Rye.

Troegner played Mrs. Gloop in the 2005 film Charlie and the Chocolate Factory. Most of her other roles were in German TV movies and serials.

In 2009, Troegner published her autobiography  (Too fat to be typecast).

Selected filmography
 Johann Sebastian Bach (1985, TV series)

External links 

 
 , profile in English

1954 births
Living people
German stage actresses
German film actresses
German television actresses
German voice actresses
Actresses from Berlin
20th-century German actresses
21st-century German actresses